The National Indigenous Music Awards 2009 are the 6th annual National Indigenous Music Awards, first under its new name after being previously called NT Indigenous Music Awards.

The awards ceremony was held on 21 August 2009.

Hall of Fame Inductees 
 Sammy Butcher, Tableland Drifters and David Asera

Sammy Butcher was born at Papunya, Northern Territory in Central Australia. He formed the Warumpi Band with George Burarrwanga, Neil Murray and Gordon Butcher in the late 1970s.

Tableland Drifters was formed in 1985 and perform country rock music across the Northern Territory.

David Asera,  a mentor, musician and helped with Road Safety All Stars and Keep Australia Beautiful.

Awards
Act of the Year

Emerging Act of the Year

The winner won a $10,000 cash prize.

Album of the Year

DVD/Film Clip of the Year

Song of the Year

Artwork of the Year

Traditional Music Award

People's Choice - Song of the Year

References

2009 in Australian music
2009 music awards
National Indigenous Music Awards